Daria is an American animated television series created by Glenn Eichler and Susie Lewis. The series focuses on Daria Morgendorffer, a smart, acerbic, and somewhat misanthropic teenage girl who observes the world around her. The show is set in the fictional suburban American town of Lawndale and is a satire of high school life, and full of allusions to and criticisms of popular culture and social classes. It aired 65 episodes across five seasons on MTV, from March 3, 1997 to January 21, 2002. Two television movies: Is It Fall Yet? and Is It College Yet?, aired in 2000 and 2002 respectively.

Series overview

Episodes

Pilot

Season 1 (1997)

Season 2 (1998)

Season 3 (1999)

Season 4 (2000)

Season 5 (2001)

Films

Specials

External links
 
 
 
 
 The Daria Webring
 Episode Guide at Outpost Daria

Episodes
Lists of American adult animated television series episodes
Lists of American comedy-drama television series episodes
Lists of American sitcom episodes
Lists of American teen comedy television series episodes
Lists of American teen drama television series episodes